The Mid-Eastern Wrestling Federation was a professional wrestling promotion based in Essex, Maryland from 1991 to 2004. Former employees in the MEWF consisted of professional wrestlers, managers, play-by-play and color commentators, announcers, interviewers and referees.

Alumni

Male wrestlers

Female wrestlers

Midget wrestlers

Stables and tag teams

Managers and valets

Commentators and interviewers

Referees

Other personnel

References
General

Specific

External links

Mid-Eastern Wrestling Federation alumni at Cagematch.net
Mid-Eastern Wrestling Federation alumni at Wrestlingdata.com

Mid-Eastern Wrestling Federation alumni